Aquarius is the second studio album by Danish–Norwegian band Aqua. The album was released on 28 February 2000 by Universal.

Singles
The lead single, "Cartoon Heroes", peaked at number one in Denmark and Norway, reached number 7 in the UK in February 2000 and later received top 10 positions globally except for the US where it failed to chart on the Billboard Hot 100. The second single, "Around the World", also peaked at number one in Denmark, but only made number 26 in UK and did not sell highly in most regions. It was the last release in most territories before the band split in 2001.

Scandinavia and other European countries saw further releases of "Bumble Bees" and "We Belong to the Sea" during late 2000, both achieving only moderate success.

"Freaky Friday" was meant to be released as a single back when the band was still promoting the album, but it ended up being cancelled. The song was then released 16 years later, in 2017, through an EP of remixes.

Commercial performance
The album debuted at number one in Denmark and Norway while peaking inside the top ten in seven countries. It sold 39,000 copies in its first week in Denmark, becoming the fastest-selling album of the decade. The album became the second best-selling album of 2000, selling 174,523 copies. As of August 2001, Aquarius had sold 265,000 copies in Denmark. It became the third best-selling album of the 2000s in Denmark.

In the United States, the album debuted at number 82 on the Billboard 200 and spent six weeks on the chart. This is a significant drop from their previous album Aquarium (1997), which peaked at number seven and spent 50 weeks on the chart. Aquarius has been certified platinum by the International Federation of the Phonographic Industry (IFPI) for shipments of one million copies inside Europe. Worldwide, the album has sold four million copies.

Track listing
All tracks written and produced by Søren Rasted and Claus Norreen, except where noted.

Personnel
Credits adapted from album liner notes.

Aqua – mixing
Stefan Boman – vocal engineering
Christian Møller Nielsen – additional programming
René Dif – lyricist, composition, lead vocals
Björn Engelmann – mastering
Nana Hedin – backing vocals
Michael Henderson – mixing
Henrik Janson – strings arrangement
Ulf Janson – strings arrangement
Ole Kibsgaard – guitar

Stig Kreutzfeldt – vocal engineering
Jörgen Larsen – scratching
Peter Ljung – piano
Bernard Löhr – mixing
Claus Norreen – composition, production, arrangement
Lene Nystrøm – lead and backing vocals
Stockholm Session Orchestra – strings
Jean-Paul Wall – backing vocals
Søren Rasted – composition, production, arrangement, backing vocals
Anders Øland – additional programming

Charts

Weekly charts

Year-end charts

Decade-end charts

Certifications and sales

Release history

References

2000 albums
Aqua (band) albums
MCA Records albums
Albums recorded at Polar Studios
Universal Records albums